Polly Emery (10 May 1875 – 31 October 1958) was an English actress of both silent and talking pictures.

She was born in Bolton, Lancashire, England and died at age 83 at 
Denville Hall, Northwood, London, England.

Selected filmography
 Watch Your Step (1920)
 The Case of Lady Camber (1920)
 Nothing Else Matters (1920)
 A Sister to Assist 'Er (1922)
 If Four Walls Told (1922)
 A Will and a Way (1922)
 The Pauper Millionaire (1922)
 Beautiful Kitty (1923)
 The Alley of Golden Hearts (1924)
 A Sister to Assist 'Er (1927)
 A Honeymoon Adventure (1931)
 The Third String (1932)
 After Dark (1933)
 The Good Companions (1933)
 Peg of Old Drury (1935)
 Wedding Group (1936)
 A Sister to Assist 'Er (1938)
 Silver Top (1938)

References

External links
 

1875 births
1958 deaths
English film actresses
English silent film actresses
People from Bolton
20th-century English actresses